Ruibal's least gecko (Sphaerodactylus ruibali) is a species of lizard in the family Sphaerodactylidae. The species is endemic to Cuba.

Etymology
The specific name, ruibali, is in honor of Cuban-American herpetologist Rodolfo Ruibal (1927–2016).

Habitat

Reproduction
S. ruibali is oviparous.

References

Further reading
Grant C (1959). "Another New Sphaerodactylus from Guantanamo, Cuba". Herpetologica 15 (1): 53. (Sphaerodactylus ruibali, new species).
Rösler H (2000). "Kommentierte Liste der rezent, subrezent und fossil bekannten Geckotaxa (Reptilia: Gekkonomorpha)". Gekkota 2: 28–153. (Sphaerodactylus ruibali, p. 114). (in German).
Schwartz A, Henderson RW (1991). Amphibians and Reptiles of the West Indies: Descriptions, Distributions, and Natural History. Gainesville, Florida: University of Florida Press. 720 pp. . (Sphaerodactylus ruibali, p. 529).
Schwartz A, Thomas R (1975). A Check-list of West Indian Amphibians and Reptiles. Carnegie Museum of Natural History Special Publication No. 1. Pittsburgh, Pennsylvania: Carnegie Museum of Natural History. 216 pp. (Sphaerodactylus ruibali, p. 161).
Thomas R, Schwartz A (1966). "The Sphaerodactylus decoratus complex in the West Indies". Brigham Young University Science Bulletin 7: 1-26.

Sphaerodactylus
Reptiles of Cuba
Endemic fauna of Cuba
Reptiles described in 1959
Taxa named by Chapman Grant